Spruce Top is a mountain located in Greene County, New York southwest of Tannersville, New York. Located to the southwest is Plateau Mountain and to the southeast is Sugarloaf Mountain. Spruce Top drains into Cook Brook and Roaring Kill, which both flow in a general northeast direction before converging with the Schoharie Creek.

References

Mountains of Greene County, New York
Mountains of New York (state)